The women's 100 metres hurdles event at the 1970 Summer Universiade was held at the Stadio Comunale in Turin on 2 and 3 September 1970. It was the first time that this hurdling distance was contested replacing the 80 metres hurdles.

Medalists

Results

Heats

Wind:Heat 1: +1.3 m/s, Heat 2: +1.4 m/s, Heat 3: +1.5 m/s

Final

References

Athletics at the 1970 Summer Universiade
1970